Allandrus is a genus of fungus weevils in the beetle family Anthribidae. There are about nine described species in Allandrus.

Species
These nine species belong to the genus Allandrus:
 Allandrus angulatus Jordan, 1906
 Allandrus bifasciatus LeConte, 1876
 Allandrus brevicornis Frost, 1920
 Allandrus comorensis Frieser & R., 1993
 Allandrus fuscipennis (Guillebeau, 1891)
 Allandrus indistinctus Jordan, 1904
 Allandrus populi Pierce, 1930
 Allandrus therondi (Tempère, 1954)
 Allandrus undulatus (Panzer & G.W.F., 1795)

References

Further reading

External links

 

Anthribidae
Articles created by Qbugbot